The Trio 2 is a live album by pianist Cedar Walton, bassist David Williams and drummer Billy Higgins recorded in 1985 and released on the Italian Red label.

Reception

AllMusic reviewer Scott Yanow awarded the album 4 stars and called it "an excellent example of Walton's distinctive approach to hard bop".

Track listing 
All compositions by Cedar Walton except as indicated
 "Theme for Ernie" (Fred Lacey) – 11:35
 "For All We Know" (J. Fred Coots, Sam M. Lewis) – 5:40
 "Ojos de Rojo" – 7:00
 "Off Minor" (Thelonious Monk) – 8:55
 "Bluesville" (Sonny Red) – 5:40
 "Jacob's Ladder" – 8:55

Personnel 
Cedar Walton – piano
David Williams – bass
Billy Higgins – drums

References 

Cedar Walton live albums
1986 live albums
Red Records live albums